Philippe Calandre (born 1964) is a French artist whose work is a combination of photography, painting and video.

Early life 
Born in Avignon in 1964, he took to the seas at age 16 where he stayed on for two years as a shipman. This voyage, an initiation of sorts, covering the Northern Atlantic to the South Pacific sharpened his sensibilities, taught him an appreciation of open spaces thus allowing the elements to shape his spirit.

Back on terra firma for health reasons, never to go back out to sea, he tries to voyage by dabbling in painting, sculpture, music and especially photography, which he holds close to heart. The collection of photos by Brassaï entitled Paris de nuit would inspire his work. He began by learning to touch up photos with an old salt of a photographer who lived in the neighbourhood, then on his own. His career as a photographer was beginning to take off.

During a banal portrait shoot he came to the realization that what he was looking at seemed to be more interesting to him through his lens than in reality. It was at this point that he realized that he would be an artist.

Professional career 

Over the course of several years he shared his time between personal research, which had him globetrotting from Bolivia to Russia, and his work as a photographer in the press. This world, however, with its own specific photographic language began to wear on Calandre. He decided, at this point, to dedicate himself to a more artistic approach to photography where he could express himself freely.

After two exhibits in Paris and Beirut, a Parisian gallery, Zabriskie, decided to include his work alongside those of Weegee and Leonard Freed as part of its « Une nuit, un voleur » series (in 1996). A few years later, the National Fund for Contemporary Art acquired ‘Ghost Stations’, a series depicting abandoned gas stations that the artist came upon during his highway rambling.

Philippe Calandre is particularly interested in architectural photography and still life. In all his series, reality serves as the foundation from which he creates his own worlds where an ambiguity, or perhaps even a confusion, between the real and the imagined settles in. His studies often were used as a springboard to highlight everyday architectural aspects, pulled from their daily lifelessness and given life. Gas stations, then his ‘silos’, which were presented at FIAC in 2001 by Anne Barrault, the Parisian gallery, with whom the artist collaborated from 1999 to 2007, were lifted to the realm of the supernatural.

For ‘Insomnia’ (2006), which depicts strange nocturnal apparitions Calandre plunges into the world of the fantastic with his pure and spooky scenes.

As early as 1996, his various series have been displayed in galleries, museums and contemporary art shows in France and abroad from Greece to Argentina to the Netherlands and back to New York and Taiwan.

External links 
 Philippecalandre

Living people
1964 births
20th-century French painters
20th-century French male artists
French male painters
21st-century French painters
21st-century French male artists
French photographers
French video artists
Artists from Avignon